The E.S. Ready House, now currently known as the Ready-Moneymaker House, is a historic house at 929 Beech Street in Helena, Arkansas.  It is a -story brick structure, designed by Charles L. Thompson and built in 1910 for E. S. Ready, a prominent Helena businessman.  It is the only known Thompson design in Helena.  The main facade is three bays wide, with a central entry sheltered by a single-story portico, which is supported by paired Doric columns and topped by a balcony with a low balustrade.  Both the main entry and the balcony door are flanked by sidelight windows, and the main entry is topped by a fanlight window.

The house was listed on the National Register of Historic Places in 1976.

See also
National Register of Historic Places listings in Phillips County, Arkansas

References

Houses on the National Register of Historic Places in Arkansas
Houses completed in 1910
Houses in Phillips County, Arkansas
National Register of Historic Places in Phillips County, Arkansas
Historic district contributing properties in Arkansas